Disraeli is a biographical play by the British writer Louis N. Parker, which was first staged in 1911. The play was commissioned by the actor George Arliss who saw a portrayal of the Victorian British statesman Benjamin Disraeli as an ideal vehicle for his stage career. It was written in London during 1910. Parker suffered from writer's block at one point and received some assistance from Arliss. Parker included a subplot lifted from the 1839 play Richelieu by Edward Bulwer-Lytton which was later the subject of some controversy. He added a number of fictitious characters to add excitement and drama to the story. The real role of Lionel de Rothschild in the purchase was changed to that of the fictional banker Meyers. The play premièred at Wallack's Theatre in New York City on 18 September 1911.

The play was a popular success for Arliss, and developed a loyal following. It became Arliss' signature role and he was strongly identified with it in popular culture.

Synopsis
In 1875, the British Prime Minister Benjamin Disraeli attempts to gain control of the Suez Canal and secure Britain's route to India. He manages to secure a loan from a London financier Meyers, but has to thwart the machinations of a network of Russian spies operating in Britain who attempt to wreck the purchase. He also has to face down fierce opposition in the House of Commons led by William Gladstone. Both Disraeli and Meyers have to contend with a degree of prejudice from their contemporaries because of their Jewish heritage.

Film adaptations
The play was adapted for the screen on three occasions. The first was a 1916 British film, Disraeli, starring the stage actor Dennis Eadie. Arliss then managed to acquire the film rights to the work for $3,000 and in 1921 he appeared in the silent film version, Disraeli.

In 1929, following the sound revolution, Arliss made a sound remake, Disraeli, for Warner Brothers. The film was a major critical and popular success and Arliss won the Academy Award for Best Actor for his performance.

References

Bibliography
 Fells, Robert M. George Arliss: The Man Who Played God . Scarecrow Press, 2004.

External links

1911 plays
British plays adapted into films
Plays set in London
Plays set in the 19th century
Plays about race and ethnicity
Plays by Louis N. Parker